Vrhe is a remote dispersed settlement in the hills northeast of Izlake in the Municipality of Zagorje ob Savi in central Slovenia. Traditionally the area is part of the Lower Styria region. It is now included with the rest of the municipality in the Central Sava Statistical Region.

References

External links
Vrhe on Geopedia

Populated places in the Municipality of Zagorje ob Savi